Franz Peter Knoodt (6 November 1811 – 27 January 1889) was a German Catholic theologian who was a native of Boppard.

He studied theology in Bonn und Tübingen, and later worked as a chaplain and teacher in Trier. In 1841-43 he furthered his studies in Vienna, where he was a student of Anton Günther (1783-1863). In 1844 he earned his doctorate of theology at Breslau, and in 1845 became a professor of philosophy at the Catholic faculty of theology at the University of Bonn. From May 1848 to February 1849 he was a member of the Frankfurt National Assembly.

Knoodt was an ardent follower of the philosophical teachings of Anton Günther, and several years after Günther's death, he published the biographical Anton Günther. Eine Biographie (1881, 2 volumes). This work has been praised as an important source of Catholic church history. Another noted work of Knoodt's was Günther und Clemens; Offene Briefe (Günther and Franz Jakob Clemens; Open Letters, 1853–54). Both publications were placed on the Index Librorum Prohibitorum (List of Prohibited Books) by the Roman Catholic Church.

References 
  English translation

1811 births
1889 deaths
People from Rhein-Hunsrück-Kreis
19th-century German Catholic theologians
Academic staff of the University of Bonn
People from the Rhine Province
German male non-fiction writers
19th-century male writers